Sproxton could be

Sproxton, Leicestershire
Sproxton, North Yorkshire
David Sproxton, animator